The 2nd Trampoline World Championships were held in Albert Hall, London, England on 30 January 1965.

Results

Men

Trampoline

Tumbling

Women

Trampoline

Tumbling

Mixed synchro trampoline

References
 Trampoline UK
 Sports123 
 FIG Press Information Kit 

Trampoline World Championships
Trampoline Gymnastics World Championships
Trampoline World Championships
Trampoline World Championships
Trampoline World Championships
Trampoline World Championships
International gymnastics competitions hosted by the United Kingdom